L.I.E. is a 2001 American drama film about a relationship between Howie, a troubled 16-year-old boy, and a middle aged man known as "Big John". The title is an acronym for the Long Island Expressway. The film was directed by Michael Cuesta, who has said that the film is about exploring sexuality. It stars Paul Dano in his first lead role as the boy Howie, and Brian Cox as John.

Plot
Howie Blitzer is deeply affected by the death of his mother in a car accident on the Long Island Expressway. His situation is exacerbated by his acrimonious relationship with his distant father Marty, who brought a trophy girlfriend into the house less than a month after his wife's death. Howie's only solace is the company of his best friend Gary, a juvenile delinquent and hustler. Although Gary is attracted to Howie, Howie is unsure of his own sexuality. They have two other friends their age, one of whom has an incestuous relationship with his sister. The four boys routinely break into neighborhood houses.

One night, they break into the house of "Big John" Harrigan during his birthday party. Gary knows his way around the house; it is later revealed that Big John is one of his steady clients. Big John interrupts them, and they narrowly escape with a pair of rare and valuable Russian pistols. John later confronts Gary over the burglary and Gary names Howie as his accomplice.

Pretending to be a friend of Howie's mother, John introduces himself and invites Howie back to his house. Once there, he confronts Howie about the burglary, demanding the return of the guns. Howie can retrieve only one of them from Gary's room, so John demands $1000 for the other; Howie can only offer to work off the debt. Putting on a pornographic video, John hints that Howie can repay him with sex. Howie hastily leaves, but after returning home, masturbates to a fantasy involving John and the girl in the video.

Gary steals money from Howie's father and disappears to Los Angeles, leaving Howie alone. John and Howie begin a tenuous friendship in which John becomes a kind of father figure to him. There is no sexual activity, but there is talk of sex. Howie realizes that he wields a degree of sexual power over John, something John is aware of. Howie stays over at John's house, temporarily displacing John's 19-year-old lover Scott, who warns Howie not to take John from him. Howie discovers a stash of child pornography in the house, including photos of a younger Gary as a blond 11-year-old boy.

Howie's father happens to see him skipping school and losing his temper, he hits the boy. Later that day, he is arrested for dangerous practices in his construction business, and when Howie returns home to find him missing, he believes his father has abandoned him. He goes to John, approaching him in his bedroom wearing just his underpants, expecting they will have sex. But John explains to Howie what happened with his father, and the boy breaks down and cries. John leaves Howie to sleep by himself.

The next morning, John is all charm, fixing Howie breakfast and taking him to see his father in jail. Howie's father apologizes for hitting him and promises to spend more time with him once he is out of prison. Howie is unconvinced, and merely tells his father never to hit him again.

After dropping Howie off, John returns to the local rest area where young hustlers connect with johns and sits in his car. Scott, devastated by John's abandonment, drives by and shoots him dead.

In the final scene, Howie contemplates the expressway, vowing he would not let it get him.

Cast
 Brian Cox as Big John Harrigan
 Paul Dano as Howie Blitzer
 Billy Kay as Gary Terrio
 Bruce Altman as Marty Blitzer
 Walter Masterson as Scott
 James Costa as Kevin Cole
 Adam LeFevre as Elliot
 Tony Donnelly as Brian
 B. Constance Barry as Anne Harrigan
 Gladys Dano as Voice of Sylvia Blitzer

Production
Portions of the film were filmed at Harborfields High School, located in Greenlawn, New York, not far from the Long Island Expressway. A scene was filmed at the Dix Hills Diner on Jericho Turnpike in Elwood, New York, and another at Callahan Beach Park in Fort Salonga, New York.

Because Paul Dano was underage at the time of production, his mother, Gladys, was present on set and additionally plays the non-speaking role of Howie's deceased mother, Sylvia, in several flashback and dream sequences.

Themes
Sexual identity is a major theme in the film; director Michael Cuesta has said that the ambiguity of Howie's sexual orientation and his relationship with Big John and Gary is at the heart of the film.

Brian Cox has said, "Big John realizes that Howie is much more than a little boy, a young boy he can hit on". Cuesta has said that John is confused, and doesn't know if he wanted "to be with him, sexually, or just father him".

Release
L.I.E premiered at the 2001 Sundance Film Festival. It went on to show at several other film festivals including the Edinburgh International Film Festival, the Bergen International Film Festival, the Stockholm International Film Festival, Outfest, the Deauville Film Festival and the Helsinki International Film Festival. The film opened to cinemas in New York on September 7, 2001.

The film received an NC-17 rating from the MPAA. After the filmmakers unsuccessfully appealed for an R rating, the film was later distributed without a rating; however, many theater chains choose not to exhibit unrated films. Both an edited version which received an R rating ("for strong sexual content involving teens, language, and brief violence") and the original unrated/uncut film are available on DVD.

Critical reception
The film has an approval rating of 84% on Rotten Tomatoes based on 86 reviews, with an average rating of 6.96/10. The critical consensus states: "L.I.E. is a well-acted and unsettling look at a boy's relationship with a pedophile."

Accolades
Awards
 Independent Spirit Award
 Best Debut Performance – Paul Dano
 Producers Award – René Bastian, Linda Moran, and Michael Cuesta
 Satellite Awards
 Best Actor – Motion Picture Drama (Brian Cox)

Nominations
 Independent Spirit Award
 Best Lead Actor – Brian Cox
 Best Supporting Male – Billy Kay
 Best First Screenplay – Stephen M. Ryder, Michael Cuesta, and Gerald Cuesta
 Best Director – Michael Cuesta
 Best Feature – Rene Bastin, Linda Moran, and Michael Cuesta
 AFI Awards
 AFI Featured Actor of the Year – Male – Movies Brian Cox

References

External links
 
 
 

2001 films
2001 directorial debut films
2001 drama films
2001 independent films
2001 LGBT-related films
American independent films
American teen drama films
American teen LGBT-related films
Films about child sexual abuse
Films directed by Michael Cuesta
Films set in Long Island
Films shot in New York (state)
Incest in film
LGBT-related drama films
2000s English-language films
Films about male prostitution in the United States
2000s American films